Malta participated in the Eurovision Song Contest 2005 with the song "Angel" written and performed by Chiara, who had previously represented Malta at the Eurovision Song Contest in the 1998 edition where she achieved third place with the song "The One That I Love". The Maltese entry for the 2005 contest in Kyiv, Ukraine was selected through the national final Malta Song for Europe 2005, organised by the Maltese broadcaster Public Broadcasting Services (PBS). The competition consisted of a final, held on 19 February 2005, where "Angel" performed by Chiara eventually emerged as the winning entry after gaining 19% of the public televote.

As one of the ten highest placed finishers in 2004, Malta automatically qualified to compete in the final of the Eurovision Song Contest. Performing during the show in position 3, Malta placed second out of the 24 participating countries with 192 points.

Background 

Prior to the 2005 Contest, Malta had participated in the Eurovision Song Contest seventeen times since its first entry in 1971. Malta briefly competed in the Eurovision Song Contest in the 1970s before withdrawing for sixteen years. The country had, to this point, competed in every contest since returning in 1991. Malta's best placing in the contest thus far was second, which it achieved in 2002 with the song "7th Wonder" performed by Ira Losco. In the 2004 edition, Malta qualified to the final and placed 12th with the song "On Again... Off Again" performed by Julie and Ludwig.

For the 2005 Contest, the Maltese national broadcaster, Public Broadcasting Services (PBS), broadcast the event within Malta and organised the selection process for the nation's entry. PBS confirmed their intentions to participate at it on 19 October 2004. Malta selected their entry consistently through a national final procedure, a method that was continued for their 2005 participation.

Before Eurovision

Malta Song for Europe 2005 
Malta Song for Europe 2005 was the national final format developed by PBS to select the Maltese entry for the Eurovision Song Contest 2005. The competition was held on 19 February 2005 at the Mediterranean Conference Centre in the nation's capital city of Valletta. The show was hosted by Clare Aguis, John Bundy and Moira Delia and broadcast on Television Malta (TVM) as well on the website di-ve.com.

Competing entries 
Artists and composers were able to submit their entries between 19 October 2004 and 24 November 2004. Songwriters from any nationality were able to submit songs as long as the artist were Maltese or either possess Maltese citizenship or heritage, and that the song was performed either in the Maltese or English language. Artists were able to submit as many songs as they wished, however, they could only compete with a maximum of one in the competition. 186 entries were received by the broadcaster. On 9 December 2005, PBS announced the song titles of 50 shortlisted entries that had progressed through the selection process. The twenty-two songs selected to compete in the competition were announced on 20 January 2005.

Among the selected competing artists was former Maltese Eurovision entrant Chiara who represented Malta in the 1998 contest, and Fabrizio Faniello who represented Malta in the 2001 contest. Among the songwriters, Paul Abela, Gerard James Borg and Philip Vella were all past writers of Maltese Eurovision entries. Paul Giordimaina represented Malta in the 1991 edition with Georgina Abela, who co-wrote the Maltese entry in 2001. Ralph Siegel and John O'Flynn co-wrote seventeen entries for various countries. On 19 January 2005, "Once Again", written by Paul Abela and Georgina Abela and to have been performed by Fabrizio Faniello, and "Sail Away", written by Marc Paelinck who co-wrote the Belgian entries in 2002 and 2004 and to have been performed by Chiara, were withdrawn from the competition and replaced with the songs "There for You" performed by Leontine and Roger, and "The Angels Are Tired" performed by Manuel due to both singers having been selected with two songs each.

Final 
The final took place on 19 February 2005. Twenty-two entries competed and the winner was determined solely by a public televote. The show was opened with a guest performance of "On Again... Off Again" performed by the 2004 Maltese Eurovision entrant Julie and Ludwig, while the interval act featured performances by the 1996, 2002 and 2005 Cypriot Eurovision entrant Constantinos Christoforou performing "Ela Ela", the 2004 Maltese Junior Eurovision entrant Young Talent Team, the Central Academy of Ballet, and the local act Corkskrew. After the results of the public televote were announced, "Angel" performed by Chiara was the winner.

Controversy 
During Malta Song for Europe 2005, it was revealed that there had been issues calculating the final result as one of the three phone operators failed to turn over their results in time and therefore the show was delayed. A complaint was also submitted by the Maltese Composers and Singers Union (UKAM) due to an electricity breakdown occurring in several cities in Malta which caused affected viewers to only be able to see the final six performances (five of the six songs were placed in the top ten, including the eventual winner, Chiara).

At Eurovision
The Eurovision Song Contest 2005 took place at the Palace of Sports in Kyiv, Ukraine and consisted of a semi-final on 19 May and the final of 21 May 2005. According to Eurovision rules, all nations with the exceptions of the host country, the "Big Four" (France, Germany, Spain and the United Kingdom) and the ten highest placed finishers in the 2005 contest are required to qualify from the semi-final in order to compete for the final; the top ten countries from the semi-final progress to the final. As one of the ten highest placed finishers in the 2004 contest, Malta automatically qualified to compete in the final. In addition to their participation in the final, Malta is also required to broadcast and vote in the semi-final. On 22 March 2005, a special allocation draw was held which determined the running order and Malta was set to perform in position 3 during the final, following the entry from United Kingdom and before the entry from Romania. Malta placed second in the final, scoring 192 points.

The semi-final and the final were broadcast in Malta on TVM with commentary by Eileen Montesin. The Maltese spokesperson, who announced the Maltese votes during the final, was Moira Delia.

Voting 
Below is a breakdown of points awarded to Malta and awarded by Malta in the semi-final and grand final of the contest. The nation awarded its 12 points to Latvia in the semi-final and to Cyprus in the final of the contest.

Points awarded to Malta

Points awarded by Malta

References

2005
Countries in the Eurovision Song Contest 2005
Eurovision